Mateusz Krzysztof Maksymilian Molęda (born December 4, 1986) is a German-Polish conductor.

Life 

Mateusz Molęda was born in Dresden, Germany, into a family of musicians. His parents Alicja Borkowska-Molęda (born January 27, 1952) and Krzysztof Molęda (born April 6, 1953) are both opera singers and sang for more than two decades title and major roles at European opera houses like the Semper Opera House, the Komische Oper Berlin, the Deutsche Oper Berlin, the Leipzig Opera, the Royal Opera Copenhagen and the Prague State Opera. Molęda holds the German and Polish citizenship.

Education 

Molęda started to play the piano at the age of six and studied from 2006 to 2011 at the Hochschule für Musik, Theater und Medien Hannover in the class of Arie Vardi, considered one of the most distinguished piano teachers of the world, who also serves as conductor of the Israel Philharmonic Orchestra for more than thirty years. He continued his studies also in the area of historical keyboard instruments and historical performance practice in cooperation with Zvi Meniker, one of the last pupils of Nikolaus Harnoncourt.

In 2021, Molęda obtained his PhD at the Krzysztof Penderecki Academy of Music in Cracow with a thesis on polyphonic compositional techniques in Sergei Rachmaninov's Symphony No. 2.

Molęda has received important musical impulses from his mentor Marek Janowski, for whom he worked by personal request also as assistant with the Berlin Philharmonic, the Berlin Radio Symphony Orchestra, the Frankfurt Radio Symphony Orchestra and the Dresden Philharmonic. By sharing his varied experiences, Janowski has profoundly influenced Molęda's artistic development in the spirit of the traditional German conducting school. He received further musical inspiration in cooperation and as cover conductor of Teodor Currentzis and the SWR Symphony Orchestra, which he accompanied on several European tours.

Molęda was a scholarship holder of the German Music Council, the German Society for the Exploitation of Ancillary Copyrights, the Theodor-Rogler-Foundation, the Anna Ruths-Foundation, the Robert-Richard-Jaudes-Foundation and the International Forum for Culture and Economy Dresden.

Collaboration with orchestras 

Molęda conducted for the first time an orchestra at the age of nineteen. He guest-conducted renowned orchestras in more than ten countries of the world, among others in the UK, Germany, Denmark, Spain, Poland, Albania, South Korea, Japan, South Africa and several countries of South America. He has worked among others with the London Mozart Players, the Orchestra of the Komische Oper Berlin, the Nuremberg Symphony, the Jena Philharmonic, the Heidelberg Philharmonic, the Deutsches Kammerorchester Berlin, the Württemberg Chamber Orchestra Heilbronn, the Folkwang Chamber Orchestra Essen, the Mecklenburgische Staatskapelle Schwerin, the Carl Nielsen Academy Orchestra, the Aalborg Symfoniorkester, the Aarhus Symfoniorkester, the Odense Symfoniorkester and the NFM Wroclaw Philharmonic.

Notable concerts 

With his performance of Beethoven's Choral Fantasy at the Ceremony of the Federal Government on the Day of German Unity on October 3, 2007, Molęda commanded attention throughout Germany. The concert was broadcast live by the German TV channel ZDF with over eight million spectators.

On 10 June 2016, Molęda conducted a German-Polish friendship concert to mark the 800th anniversary of the city of Koszalin, during which orchestra musicians from the Nuremberg Symphony Orchestra and the Koszalin Philharmonic Orchestra shared the stage. The Two Tone Pictures for Orchestra Op. 19 by Karl Adolf Lorenz were premiered during this concert. The Bavarian Television made the documentary film "Die doppelte Heimat" about this event.

On November 8, 2018, Molęda conducted the world premiere of the Concerto for Hammond organ by the Danish composer Anders Koppel, the first composition of this genre ever.

Teaching activities 

Molęda holds since 2022 a teaching position at the Mannheim University of Music and Performing Arts.

Activity as lecturer 

In addition to his work as a conductor, Molęda gives lectures throughout Germany on the topic of "United in diversity – How music strengthens the bonds between the Europeans", among others at the Forum Heiligenberg of the Schloss Heiligenberg Seeheim-Jugenheim Foundation and the Hessian State Centre for Political Education in Wiesbaden.

TV and radio recordings 

Numerous radio and television recordings are available, including for BR Klassik, MDR Kultur, DR 2, KBS, BR-Fernsehen, MDR Fernsehen, MBC and the streaming platform Vialma.

CD releases (selection) 
 2010: Flügelschwingen (piano works by Scarlatti, Mozart, Schumann and Chopin)

Personal life 

Molęda lives in Hanover, Germany. He is fluent in German, Polish, English, French and Russian. He is an avid golfer and has been actively involved in team sports and as a board member of the Dresden Elbflorenz Golf Club and the Burgwedel Golf Club.

References

External links 
 

German male conductors (music)
1986 births
Living people
Musicians from Dresden
21st-century German conductors (music)
21st-century German male musicians